Isabella Patricola (c. 1886 – May 23, 1965), known professionally by her stage name "Miss Patricola," was an American vaudeville performer popular in the 1920s. She was the sister of entertainer Tom Patricola. She appeared in a 1929 Home-Talkie Productions sound film.

Death
Isabella Patricola died of a stroke in 1965, aged 79, in Manhasset, New York.

References

External links

1880s births
1965 deaths
Vaudeville performers
20th-century American actresses
Date of birth unknown